Landscape with Orpheus and Eurydice is a 124 × 200 cm (approx 4 × 6.5 feet) oil-on-canvas painting by the French artist Nicolas Poussin, painted between 1650 and 1653. It depicts a mythological subject in the classical style and is in the collection of the Louvre in Paris.

History
Nicolas Poussin painted this work for his longtime friend and patron Jean Pointel, who was a rich banker in Paris. Pointel also was a member of the libertines, a circle which Poussin himself frequented. It was in Pointel's collection, which had many works by Poussin, but was stored away after the political climate in Paris changed. In its place Poussin`s landscape with snake and dying man, was hung in Pointel`s private collection.

Poussin places the story of Orpheus in the Campagna Romana (Roman countryside): the Castel Sant'Angelo and the Torre delle Milizie ("Tower of the Militia") figure in this painting, borrowed from the landscape of the Eternal City. Dense smoke pours from a fire which devastates the Castle, and darkens a sky already overcast with sombre clouds. The fall of the light divides the landscape diagonally into bright and dark areas – a division clearly seen on the Torre delle Milizie.

Many of Poussin's pictures have darkened, mainly as a result of a red underpainting which has begun to show through the colours. The Orpheus, however, is free of this: it has kept its original transparency even in the darker passages, and the whole painting is in a particularly fine state of preservation.

This work by Poussin remains cryptic and there are various opinions about possible ways to decipher it.

See also

 Baroque painting
 Et in Arcadia ego
 History of painting
 List of Nicolas Poussin paintings
 Western painting

Notes

References
 
 
 
 
 
 
 
 F. Negri Arnoldi, Storia dell'Arte, Fabbri Group (1990), Vol.III, 
 
 , Chapter 3. Poussin's hands and Titian's eyes

External links

 Orphée et Eurydice at the Louvre 
 Orphée et Eurydice by Poussin, on website delapeinture.com 
 Nicolas Poussin Biography, Style and Artworks
 Poussin and Nature: Arcadian Visions at the Metropolitan Museum of Art, New York
 92 works by Nicolas Poussin
 

Mythological paintings by Nicolas Poussin
1650s paintings
Paintings in the Louvre by French artists
Landscape paintings
Paintings depicting Greek myths